All-Out Sundays (also known as AOS or AyOS) is a Philippine television variety show broadcast by GMA Network. Hosted by Alden Richards, Julie Anne San Jose, Rayver Cruz, Ken Chan, Rita Daniela, Christian Bautista, Aicelle Santos, and Mark Bautista, it premiered on January 5, 2020, on the network's Sunday Grande sa Hapon line up replacing Sunday PinaSaya.

The show is originally titled as All-Out Sunday. It is streaming online on YouTube, Facebook, and TikTok.

Cast

Main hosts
 Alden Richards 
 Julie Anne San Jose 
 Rayver Cruz 
 Ken Chan 
 Rita Daniela 
 Christian Bautista 
 Aicelle Santos 
 Mark Bautista 
 Gabbi Garcia 
 Derrick Monasterio 
 Glaiza de Castro 
 Ruru Madrid 
 Barbie Forteza 
 Rhian Ramos 
 Sanya Lopez 
 Carla Abellana 

Co-hosts / Performers
 Miguel Tanfelix 
 Kyline Alcantara 
 Cassy Legaspi 
 Mavy Legaspi 
 Joaquin Domagoso 
 Lexi Gonzales 
 Kim de Leon 
 Shayne Sava 
 Golden Cañedo 
 Jeremiah Tiangco 
 Garrett Bolden 
 Thea Astley 
 Vince Crisostomo 
 Allen Ansay 
 Radson Flores 
 Abdul Raman 
 Paolo Contis 
 Cacai Bautista 
 Betong Sumaya 
 Jeniffer Maravilla 
 Nef Medina 
 Jak Roberto 
 Jeric Gonzales 
 Paul Salas 
 Zonia Mejia 
 Jamir Zabarte 
 Rodjun Cruz 
 Khalil Ramos 
 Jessica Villarubin 
 Jennie Gabriel 
 Lani Misalucha 
 Rochelle Pangilinan 
 Althea Ablan 
 Denise Barbacena 
 Mark Herras 
 Kristoffer Martin 
 Tuesday Vargas 
 Ysabel Ortega 
 Hannah Precillas 
 Yasser Marta 
 Mitzi Josh 
 Pamela Prinster 
 Sheemee Buenaobra 
 Gabrielle Hann 
 Sandro Muhlach 
 Brianna Bunagan 
 Pokwang 
 EA Guzman 
 Buboy Villar 
 Pekto 
 Sofia Pablo 
 Bruce Roeland 
 Bianca Umali 
 Crystal Paras 
 Lala Vinzon 
 Angelic Guzman 
 Matt Lozano 
 Julia Pascual 
 Shanelle Agustin 
 Anthony Rosaldo 
 Andrea Torres 
 Max Collins 
 Coleen Paz 
 Hannah Arguelles 
 Mariane Osabel 
 Vilmark Viray 
 Mauie Francisco 
 Eugene Domingo 
 Zephanie 
 Rufa Mae Quinto 
 Faith da Silva 
 Maricris Garcia 
 Divine Aucina 
 Kylie Padilla 
 Psalms David 
 Sef Cadayona 
 Jillian Ward 

Groups
 XOXO 
 Lyra Micolob
 Riel Lomadilla
 Mel Caluag
 Dani Ozaraga
 Sparkada 
 Saviour Ramos
 Roxie Smith
 Anjay Anson
 Vanessa Peña
 Jeff Moses
 Cheska Fausto
 Michael Sager
 Kirsten Gonzales
 Kim Perez
 Caitlyn Steve
 Vince Maristela
 Dilek Montemayor
 Raheel Bhyria
 Tanya Ramos
 Larkin Castor
 Lauren King
 Sean Lucas

Former group
 All-Out QTs 

Musicians
 Marc Lopez - Musical director / arranger / 1st keyboard 
 Niño Regalado - Drums 
 Jem Florendo - 2nd keyboard 
 Gerald Flores - Bass guitar 
 Sushi Reyes - Backup singer 
 Manolo Tanquilut - Backup singer 
 Vincent de Jesus - Comedy musical director / arranger 
 Cezar Aguas - Acoustic guitar 

Former musicians
 Soc Mina - Bass guitar 
 Noel Mendez - Acoustic guitar 

Former cast
 Antonette Tismo 
 Karl Aquino 
 Jerick Dolormente 
 Super Tekla 
 Boobay 
 Donita Nose 
 Philip Lazaro 
 Kisses Delavin 
 Migo Adecer 
 DJ Loonyo 
 Manilyn Reynes 
 Mikoy Morales 
 Mannex Manhattan 
 Mico Aytona 
 Kitkat 
 Jong Madaliday 
 Joey Paras 
 Camille Prats 
 Mitch Valdez 
 Patrick Quiroz

Segments
 Sing Kilig 
 Oh, Gwaps!/The OGs 
 Divas of the Queendom 
 Men of Kingdom 
 Sayaw-One 
 Limitless 
 Queendom X Kingdom 
 Super Champions 
 Tune-Pak Na Pak! 
 P-Pop Power 
 AyOS Lounge 
 Musical BAR-dagulan 
 Engkanto Academy 
 Barkadaoke 

Defunct
 FTW: Four The Win 
 All-Out Stage 
 Press Play 
 Tapsikret 
 Ano Raw?! 
 Familympics 
 Don't Me! 
 Walang Talent Show 
 Mass Dancing 
 Pasa Mode 
 Sana All: Hugot From The Heart 
 Tara! Let's Duet 
 Bentang Benta 
 Ang Drama Mo 
 TikTok Battle 
 All-Out Concert 
 All-Star Assembly 
 Cypher 
 Eternal Flame 
 All For Love 
 Love Doctors 
 I'm Byerna 
 #FYP: Fresh Young Peeps 
 Tik-Pak Boom! 
 Isla Fantasia 
 The Nightingale Sings 
 Ka-Sing Style 
 Master Sessions 
 AyOS Ang Pasko 
 The Clash Originals 
 Ka-Sing Style: Dance Edition 
 Hulaoke 
 Marites at Marisol/Marites at Marichu/Chismax Game 
 Ibong Pak Na Pak 
 Danserye 
 Queen Beks 
 Kung Sigurado Ka, Putukin Mo! 
 Tanging Treasure 
 Move In, Move On 
 GG Girls 
 Scam Busters

Production
In March 2020, the admission of a live audience in the studio and production were suspended due to the enhanced community quarantine in Luzon caused by the COVID-19 pandemic. The show resumed its programming on July 12, 2020. Louie Ignacio temporarily served as the director on September 5–26, 2021.

Ratings
According to AGB Nielsen Philippines' Nationwide Urban Television Audience Measurement People in Television Homes, the pilot episode of All-Out Sundays earned a 6.1% rating.

Accolades

References

External links
 
 

2020 Philippine television series debuts
Filipino-language television shows
GMA Network original programming
Philippine variety television shows
Television productions suspended due to the COVID-19 pandemic